Russell Harry Colman Green  (10 April 1908 – 6 February 1975) was an organist and composer based in England and Canada.

Life

He was born in Norwich on 10 April 1908. He studied at the Birmingham School of Music and with G. D. Cunningham and Herbert Howells.

He conducted the Olton Orchestra 1926–47, the Birmingham Festival Choral Society 1945–54, and the Russell Green Choir 1949–58.

He moved to Ottawa, Canada in 1958 and died on 6 February 1975 in Saskatoon.

Appointments

Organist of St Bartholomew's Church, Edgbaston, Birmingham 1933–????
Organist of First Baptist Church (Ottawa) 1959–63
Dean of Music at Acadia University 1963–65
Organist at Knox United Church (Saskatoon) 1965–69
Organist at Christ Church, Saskatoon 1969–75

Compositions

His compositions include over 350 songs, around 50 keyboard works, 50 sacred and secular choral pieces, a Paean for orchestra, and a cantata, Christus mediator (1962).

References

1908 births
1975 deaths
English organists
British male organists
English emigrants to Canada
Fellows of the Royal College of Organists
Musicians from Norwich
20th-century classical musicians
20th-century English composers
20th-century organists
20th-century British male musicians